The men's hammer throw event at the 2004 World Junior Championships in Athletics was held in Grosseto, Italy, at Stadio Olimpico Carlo Zecchini on 15 and 16 July.  A 6 kg (junior implement) hammer was used.

Medalists

Results

Final
16 July

Qualifications
15 July

Group A

Group B

Participation
According to an unofficial count, 24 athletes from 18 countries participated in the event.

References

Hammer throw
Hammer throw at the World Athletics U20 Championships